Damian William Jones (born June 30, 1995) is an American professional basketball player for the Utah Jazz of the National Basketball Association (NBA). He played college basketball for the Vanderbilt Commodores. Jones was selected in the first round of the 2016 NBA draft by the Golden State Warriors with the 30th overall pick. He is a two-time NBA champion, having won both with Golden State in 2017 and 2018.

High school career
Jones attended Scotlandville Magnet High School in Baton Rouge, Louisiana where he averaged 15.4 points, 8.0 rebounds, 4.0 blocks, and 2.0 assists as a senior. He was rated by Rivals.com as a four-star recruit and committed to Vanderbilt University.

College career
In three seasons at Vanderbilt, Jones averaged 13.3 points, 6.4 rebounds, 1.69 blocks and 27.2 minutes in 99 games, garnering first-team All-SEC honors as both a sophomore and junior. Jones hit 56.6 percent from the field during his collegiate career, the third-best mark in Vanderbilt history, while finishing second on the school's all-time blocks list (167). As a junior in 2015–16, Jones averaged 13.9 points, 6.9 rebounds and 1.64 blocks in 33 games, helping Vanderbilt to their first NCAA Tournament berth since 2011–12.

On April 14, 2016, Jones declared for the NBA draft, forgoing his final year of college eligibility.

Professional career

Golden State Warriors (2016–2019)
While working out with the Orlando Magic in the lead up to the draft, Jones suffered a torn pectoral muscle in his right arm, which required surgery. Despite this, Jones was selected by the Golden State Warriors with the 30th overall pick in the 2016 NBA draft. He signed with the Warriors on July 13, and made his NBA debut on December 10 against the Memphis Grizzlies. On February 1, 2017, in his first game for the Warriors at Oracle Arena, Jones scored his first career NBA points in a 126–111 win over the Charlotte Hornets. He appeared in 10 regular-season games and four playoff games during the 2016–17 season. The Warriors were crowned champions in 2017 after defeating the Cleveland Cavaliers 4–1 in the NBA Finals. The 2017–18 season saw Jones appear in 15 regular-season games and four playoff games, as the Warriors returned to the NBA Finals, where they won their second straight championship. During his first two seasons, he received multiple assignments to the Santa Cruz Warriors, Golden State's G League affiliate.

Jones became the starting center for the Warriors in 2018–19, starting in 22 of the Warriors' first 24 games. On December 1, 2018, he suffered a torn left pectoral muscle in a 111–102 loss to the Detroit Pistons. He initially was ruled out for the season after undergoing surgery to repair the muscle. He returned to action during the Western Conference Finals. The Warriors went on to reach the 2019 NBA Finals, where they lost to the Toronto Raptors in six games.

Atlanta Hawks (2019–2020)
On July 8, 2019, Jones, along with a 2026 second-round pick, was traded to the Atlanta Hawks in exchange for Omari Spellman.

Phoenix Suns (2020–2021)
On November 30, 2020, Jones signed a 2-year deal with the Phoenix Suns. In 14 games, he averaged 1.6 points and 1.3 rebounds per game. On February 23, 2021, Jones was waived by the Suns.

Los Angeles Lakers (2021)
On February 26, 2021, Jones signed a 10-day contract with the Los Angeles Lakers. On March 11, the Lakers signed him to a second 10-day contract.

Sacramento Kings (2021–2022) 
On April 7, 2021, Jones signed a 10-day contract with the Sacramento Kings and ten days later, he signed a second one. On April 28, he signed a multi-year deal with the Kings after appearing in six games, including two starts.

Return to the Lakers (2022–2023) 
On July 1, 2022, Jones signed with the Los Angeles Lakers.

Utah Jazz (2023–present)
On February 9, 2023, Jones was traded to the Utah Jazz in a three-team trade involving the Minnesota Timberwolves. He made his Jazz debut on February 15, recording seven points, two rebounds and two blocks in a 117–111 loss to the Memphis Grizzlies.

Career statistics

NBA

Regular season

|-
| style="text-align:left; background:#afe6ba;"|†
| style="text-align:left;"|Golden State
| 10 || 0 || 8.5 || .500 ||  || .300 || 2.3 || .0 || .1 || .4 || 1.9
|-
| style="text-align:left; background:#afe6ba;"|†
| style="text-align:left;"|Golden State
| 15 || 0 || 5.9 || .500 ||  || .600 || .9 || .1 || .1 || .2 || 1.7
|-
| style="text-align:left;"|
| style="text-align:left;"|Golden State
| 24 || 22 || 17.1 || .716 ||  || .649 || 3.1 || 1.2 || .5 || 1.0 || 5.4
|-
| style="text-align:left;"|
| style="text-align:left;"|Atlanta
| 55 || 27 || 16.1 || .680 || .222 || .738 || 3.7 || .6 || .5 || .7 || 5.6
|-
| style="text-align:left;" rowspan=3|
| style="text-align:left;"|Phoenix
| 14 || 0 || 6.7 || .500 || .000 || .545 || 1.3 || .3 || .1 || .4 || 1.6
|-
| style="text-align:left;"|L.A. Lakers
| 8 || 6 || 14.0 || .941 ||  || .917 || 3.3 || .1 || .1 || .9 || 5.4
|-
| style="text-align:left;"|Sacramento
| 17 || 4 || 20.1 || .657 || .250 || .714 || 4.5 || 1.4 || .5 || 1.0 || 6.9
|-
| style="text-align:left;"|
| style="text-align:left;"|Sacramento
| 56 || 15 || 18.2 || .658 || .345 || .718 || 4.4 || 1.2 || .5 || .8 || 8.1
|-
| style="text-align:left;"|
| style="text-align:left;"|L.A. Lakers
| 22 || 1 || 8.0 || .541 || .000 || .750 || 2.5 || .2 || .1 || .5 || 2.5
|- class="sortbottom"
| style="text-align:center;" colspan="2"|Career
| 221 || 75 || 14.5 || .658 || .283 || .704 || 3.3 || .8 || .4 || .7 || 5.3

Playoffs

|-
| style="text-align:left; background:#afe6ba;"|2017†
| style="text-align:left;"|Golden State
| 4 || 0 || 5.3 || .429 ||  || .500 || 1.5 || .0 || .5 || .3 || 1.8
|-
| style="text-align:left; background:#afe6ba;"|2018†
| style="text-align:left;"|Golden State
| 4 || 0 || 2.8 || .500 ||  || .667 || .8 || .0 || .0 || .0 || 1.0
|-
| style="text-align:left;"|2019
| style="text-align:left;"|Golden State
| 4 || 1 || 2.0 || 1.000||  || .500 || .5 || .0 || .0 || .0 || .8
|- class="sortbottom"
| style="text-align:center;" colspan="2"|Career
| 12 || 1 || 3.3 || .500 ||  || .571 || .9 || .0 || .2 || .1 || 1.2

College

|-
| style="text-align:left;"|2013–14
| style="text-align:left;"|Vanderbilt
| 31 || 28 || 25.7 || .543 ||  || .545 || 5.7 || .2 || .3 || 1.4 || 11.3
|-
| style="text-align:left;"|2014–15
| style="text-align:left;"|Vanderbilt
| 35 || 34 || 29.1 || .562 || .200 || .599 || 6.5 || .7 || .6 || 2.0 || 14.5
|-
| style="text-align:left;|2015–16
| style="text-align:left;|Vanderbilt
| 33 || 33 || 26.2 || .590 || .000 || .536 || 6.9 || 1.2 || .2 || 1.6 || 13.9
|- class="sortbottom"
| style="text-align:center;" colspan="2"|Career
| 99 || 95 || 27.1 || .566 || .125 || .565 || 6.4 || .7 || .4 || 1.7 || 13.3

Personal life
The son of David and Dana Jones, he has two brothers, Darian and Darryl. Jones majored in engineering science.

References

External links

 Vanderbilt Commodores bio

1995 births
Living people
African-American basketball players
American men's basketball players
Atlanta Hawks players
Basketball players from Baton Rouge, Louisiana
Centers (basketball)
Golden State Warriors draft picks
Golden State Warriors players
Los Angeles Lakers players
Phoenix Suns players
Sacramento Kings players
Santa Cruz Warriors players
Vanderbilt Commodores men's basketball players